Paul Massarek was an Austrian field hockey player. He competed in the men's tournament at the 1928 Summer Olympics.

References

Year of birth missing
Year of death missing
Austrian male field hockey players
Olympic field hockey players of Austria
Field hockey players at the 1928 Summer Olympics
Place of birth missing